Same Difference were a British bubblegum pop duo.

Same Difference may also refer to:

 Same Difference (album), by Entombed, 1998
 The Same Difference, a 2015 American documentary film
 Same Difference and Other Stories, a graphic novel by Derek Kirk Kim